Drishyam is a 2013 Indian Malayalam-language crime thriller film written and directed by Jeethu Joseph. It stars Mohanlal and Meena, with Ansiba Hassan, Esther Anil, Kalabhavan Shajohn, Asha Sharath, Siddique, Roshan Basheer and Neeraj Madhav in supporting roles. The film was produced by Antony Perumbavoor for Aashirvad Cinemas. It is the first installment to the series followed by Drishyam 2. It follows the struggle of Georgekutty and his family, who come under suspicion when Varun Prabhakar, the son of the IG Geetha Prabhakar, goes missing.

The film began principal photography in the first week of October 2013 at Thodupuzha in Kerala, where the film was extensively shot. Filming was completed in 44 days which was originally scheduled for 52 days. The cinematography was done by Sujith Vaassudev and was edited by Ayoob Khan. The soundtrack of the film was composed by Anil Johnson and Vinu Thomas.

Released on 19 December 2013 in Kerala, Drishyam received widespread critical acclaim  with critics praising the screenplay, the performances and direction. It was the first Malayalam film to collect 50 crore at the box office. The film grossed over 75 crore worldwide and ran for more than 150 days in theatres. It remained the highest-grossing Malayalam film of all time until it was surpassed by Pulimurugan in 2016. It also became the longest-running film in the United Arab Emirates, running 125 days.

Drishyam won numerous accolades, including the Kerala State Film Award for Best Film with Popular Appeal and Aesthetic Value and the Filmfare Award for Best Film – Malayalam and screened at the 45th International Film Festival of India and the 8th Asian Film Festival.

It was remade into four other Indian languages: Drishya (2014) in Kannada, Drushyam (2014) in Telugu, Papanasam (2015) in Tamil and Drishyam (2015) in Hindi. It was also remade in Sinhala language as Dharmayuddhaya (2017) and in Chinese as Sheep Without a Shepherd (2019)  thereby becoming the first Indian film to be remade in Mainland China. The Indonesian remake was announced in September 2021  making it the first Indian movie to be remade in Indonesian. A sequel Drishyam 2 was released in 2021.

Plot
Georgekutty is an orphan who had dropped out of school after his 4th standard. He is now is a businessman running a cable television service in a rural area in Rajakkad. He is married to Rani and they have two daughters, Anju, a +2 student, and Anu, a student of 6th class. His only interest apart from his family is watching films. He spends most of his time in front of the TV in his small office.

During a nature camp, Anju gets photographed in the bathroom by a hidden cell phone. The culprit Varun, is the son of IG Geetha Prabhakar. Varun is accidentally killed by Rani and her daughter when he comes to blackmail them using the clip either any one of them should sleep with him or he will surely publish the clip through Internet. They hide his body in a compost pit, which is witnessed by Anu. Rani tells Georgekutty about the incident and he devises a way to save his family from the law. He removes the broken cell phone and disposes of Varun's car, which is seen by a police constable, Sahadevan, who has a grudge against Georgekutty. Georgekutty takes his family on a trip to attend a religious meeting, watch a movie and eat at a restaurant. Geetha, realising that her son has gone missing starts an investigation.

After a preliminary investigation, Geetha calls Georgekutty and family for questioning. Georgekutty had predicted that this would happen and taught his family how to change their alibi at the time of murder. When questioned individually, they reply the same thing and they had also shown the bill of the restaurant, the movie tickets and the bus journeys' tickets as proof of their alibi. Geetha questions the owners of the establishments they have been to and their statements prove Georgekutty's alibi. Geetha realises that on the day of the incident, Georgekutty had taken the tickets and the bill, made acquaintance with the owners and had gone for the trip with his family the next day, thus proving his alibi and making the owners unwittingly tell the lie.

Geetha arrests Georgekutty and family and Sahadevan uses brute force to beat the truth out of them. Eventually, Anu gives in and reveals the place where the body is buried. After digging the compost pit, they find the carcass of a calf, indicating that Georgekutty had moved the body. Anu reports to the media and complains against Sahadevan, who is later suspended and Geetha resigns from her post. Geetha and her husband Prabhakar meet Georgekutty to ask forgiveness for their rude and violent behavior. Georgekutty suspects there might be foul play involved and still does not reveal directly that his family has committed a crime. Georgekutty, now in remand, signs a register at the newly constructed local police station and leaves.

As he exits from the Police Station, it is revealed that Georgekutty had hidden Varun's body in the foundations of the very police station that he is walking out of.

Cast 

 Mohanlal as Georgekutty, a local cable TV operator
 Meena as Rani George, Georgekutty's wife
 Ansiba Hassan as Anju George, George's elder daughter
 Esther Anil as Anumol George (Anu), George's younger daughter
 Asha Sharath as Geetha Prabhakar, Inspector General of Police
 Siddique as Prabhakar, Geetha's husband
 Kalabhavan Shajon as Constable Sahadevan 
 Neeraj Madhav as Monichan, George's aide
 Irshad as SI Suresh Babu
 Roshan Basheer as Varun Prabhakar, Geetha & Prabhakar's son
 Aneesh G. Menon as Rajesh, Rani's brother
 Kunchan as Head constable S. Madhavan
 Kozhikode Narayanan Nair as Sulaiman, Owner of the Tea Shop
 Baiju V. K. as Soman
 P. Sreekumar as Rani's father
 Shobha Mohan as Rani's mother
 Koottickal Jayachandran as Murali
 Kalabhavan Rahman as Bus Conductor
 Kalabhavan Haneef as Theatre Operator
 Balaji Sharma as Restaurant Owner
 Pradeep Chandran as the new Sub-Inspector
 Antony Perumbavoor as Antony, a police officer
 Mela Raghu as Raghu, Waiter at the Tea Shop
 Arun S. Panackal as Alex, Varun's friend at Nature Camp
 Nisha Sarang as School Principal
Jeethu Joseph as Contractor of Police Station building

Production

Development 
In July 2013, it was reported that Jeethu Joseph will be directing a film titled My Family with Mohanlal in the lead. In August 2013, Jeethu clarified that the film was titled Drishyam. A thread similar to that of Drishyam has been with the director since the early 1990s. He was inspired by a conversation he had overheard about the plight of two families involved in a legal battle. Jeethu had penned the story of Drishyam even before Memories (2013). He says, "I started working on the subject some two years back. But I wanted to stick to the planned order and hence postponed the project till I finished Memories". The script was initially planned to be filmed by another director but since that director could not find a producer, Jeethu took back the script and decided to direct it himself. Drishyam contrasts from the director's previous films. He says, "Different films require different treatment. I toiled hard while filming Memories as the film was full of twists and turns and the handling of the subject mattered a lot. But Drishyam is a complete script-oriented film that does not require any special effort. We shot the film sticking completely to the script, and the shooting was completed effortlessly."

Casting 
Jeethu had initially approached Mammootty to play the lead, but he was unable to commit and asked Jeethu to proceed with the film with another actor. According to the director, Mammootty was instrumental in casting actress Meena for the film. The director, in an interview with The New Indian Express, stated that he wrote the screenplay with Mohanlal in mind and that the character was tailor-made for Mohanlal. He later added that no changes were made in the script when Mohanlal agreed.

Kalabhavan Shajohn, who previously worked in the industry as a comedian and the sidekick of the lead actors, was chosen for the main antagonistic role. The director stated, "I had two-three actors in mind, but at last decided to pick Shajon. I was very clear that I did not want anyone who has played negative characters so far to do the role. Shajon was a total revelation." Roshan Basheer, who debuted through Plus Two (2010), was chosen after conducting a screen test. Asha Sarath was later signed for the role of a police officer. Child actors Ansiba Hassan and Esther Anil, along with Siddique, Irshad, Kunchan and Koottickal Jayachandran were also cast to play major supporting roles.

Filming 
Drishyam commenced principal photography in the first week of October 2013. Mohanlal joined the sets only from 10 October. The film was shot at Thodupuzha in Kerala. The road-side house shown in the film, which was a major location, is situated at Vazhithala, near Thodupuzha. The shooting had to be halted for a while as Meena fainted on the location. Drishyam was initially planned to be filmed in 52 days, though it was completed in 44 days.

Themes 
A reviewer from The Hindu noted, "The film takes off as a typical family drama. The first half of the film is intentionally slow-paced and shows to the audience the lighter moments in the family of Georgekutty. This half combines the elements of drama and comedy genres. The audience gets completely absorbed in the twist of events that begin to unfold from the end of the first half. The second half is more like a thriller and is about how the family, despite the vengeful villainy of a corrupt cop, stands its ground even as the law takes its course." When asked whether this change in narrative style post-interval was intentional, Jeethu replied: "I really don't understand when people say the first half lacked pace. A story or a film has its own way of progression and it does travel in a zig-zag away, capturing all the ups and downs of our lives. Right from the start if you accelerate the pace, sooner or later, the story-telling will lose its steam."

When asked whether he had kicked off a new genre in Malayalam—family thriller, a genre which combines the elements of a family drama and thriller, Jeethu replied, "I still believe it belongs to the genre 'drama', not a thriller." He also stated in another interview, "We usually brand a film as a thriller, simply because there is some mystery in the narrative or the story unfolds through an investigation. But I don't subscribe to this. Although there are some twists in the tale and some suspense as well, Drishyam is essentially the story of a family."

The film has also been said to be inspired by The Devotion of Suspect X, a Japanese novel written by Keigo Higashino. Ekta Kapoor, who had purchased the Hindi movie rights of the novel, sent a legal notice to the makers of the film. However, the director clarified, "After Ekta's legal team sent us the letter, I watched the Japanese film, Suspect X, which is an adaptation of the Japanese novel. There could be similarities between my film and that Japanese film, but my film is neither an adaptation nor a copy. The Japanese film is also about a murder cover-up and hence the allegation. Similarities are quite common in the works of creators and that shouldn't be made into an issue." Rashomon (1950) was also cited as an inspiration for the film.

The film was criticised for the use of some "sexist dialogues" in the first half which were playing to a certain "new generation" audience. Sowmya Rajendran of Sify criticised the same and stated about one of such scenes in the film, "it is such banter, which we often dismiss with a laugh, that helps perpetuate rape culture." When asked about this, the director replied, "I firmly believe such conversations are part of our lives. I don't want to elaborate, but it also throws an insight into each character featured in the sequences. Yes, frankly, I was a bit worried how the family audience would react to those scenes. But then I read out that part of the script to a select group of women and they nodded their heads in approval."

There were also allegations that Drishyam might provoke murder. Kerala ADGP T.P.Senkumar IPS claimed that two people accused of murdering a woman from Nilambur in February 2014 admitted that their methods for disposing of the victim's body and mobile phone SIM card were influenced by the film. The murder of a young girl in Irinjalakuda by her father and his mistress was also said to be influenced by Drishyam.

Music

Drishyam soundtrack album features two songs used in the film, each of them were composed by Anil Johnson and Vinu Thomas, with lyrics penned by Santhosh Varma; the former provided the background score for the film. The album was released on 25 November 2013 by Muzik 247.

Veeyen of NowRunning noted in his review of the film that the songs "have a refreshingly delightful tenor to them that deserve an applause for certain." The reviewer of IndiaGlitz called the score "refreshing" and stated that it "builds the tempo" for the film.

Release

Theatrical
Drishyam released on 19 December 2013 in India. It also received a theatrical release in the United States, United Kingdom and the United Arab Emirates on 3 January 2014. The film was selected to be screened in the Indian Panorama at the 45th International Film Festival of India. It also screened at the 8th Asian Film Festival held in Jeddah in 2015, representing India.

Home media 
Drishyam was released on Blu-ray Disc, DVD and VCD on 9 May 2014. The film created a new record in the DVD and VCD sales on the first day of release itself. It had its global television premiere on 7 September 2014 at 6 pm. IST.

Plagiarism allegations 
In August 2014, film director Satheesh Paul filed a copyright infringement suit against the makers, saying that it had similarities to his script titled Oru Mazhakkalathu, written in 2013. The court passed an order saying that the movie had prima facie similarities to Satheesh' script, but allowed the making of the Tamil version Papanasam to proceed, on the condition that the makers of Drishyam produce a 10 lakh bank guarantee before the court to ensure the compensation. The case was dismissed in March 2015 as it was proved that Jeethu had written the script in 2011.

Reception

Critical response 

Sify's reviewer rated the film as "Excellent" and stated, "It is not often that you sit in a theatre with bated breath, never wanting to miss a moment of the film on screen. Writer director Jeethu Joseph's Drishyam is one such film, a gripping tale that leaves you spellbound with its skillful craft." Veeyen of NowRunning rated the film 3/5 and commented, "In Drishyam Jeethu attempts a stunning mix of the real with the imaginary, and the result is an unpredictable cinematic artichoke that takes you by surprise at every turn." Rating the film 3.5/5, Paresh C Palicha of Rediff said, "Drishyam can be credited for bringing Mohanlal back to form and pushing director Jeethu Joseph into the big league as he has made a cracker of a thriller." Jabir Mushthari of The Hindu wrote: "It takes craft, intelligence, and the superior acumen of a genuine storyteller to pull off a film in such an engaging manner." He also noted that the film's "thread and treatment are new to Malayalam cinema in many ways" and its "principles go against the set rules film goers here are familiar with".

Shibu B S of The New Indian Express wrote, "For his latest outing Drishyam, Jeethu attempts a splendid mix of emotions, relationships, suspense and thrill. End result: a spectacular cinematic experience." Dalton L of Deccan Chronicle gave the film a 3-star rating, writing, "The limelight belongs entirely to Mohanlal. Like the versatile greats of Hollywood, this actor possesses such a vast repertoire that he isn't required to always attempt the radically new to stamp his towering persona." Mythily Ramachandran wrote in her review for Gulf News: "Drishyam is an unforgettable picture, shorn of irrational fight sequences and mindless dance numbers." Aswin J Kumar of The Times of India said, "Drishyam is an elegantly crafted piece of film which Lal and Joseph can proudly hold close to their hearts."

Unni R. Nair noted in his review for Kerala9.com, "The care with which the script is done, the finesse with which the direction part is executed and the characterization and performance plus the thoughtful placing of the songs makes Drishyam worth real appreciation. That the film has almost zero-'filmy' humour is also worth noting. It's the logical manner in which the story unfolds and the very convincing manner in which the characters behave makes it impressive." The critic rated the film three in a scale of five. IndiaGlitz's reviewer rated the film 8/10 and stated, "Drishyam is undoubtedly cladded with exceptional story telling combined with bravura performances. An undoubtedly exceptional film as far the content is concerned, the movie is a must watch for all the audiences of family and thriller movies."

Box office 
According to Sify, the film "started on a low key" but "swept the box-office" from its second day of release. The film grossed 38 million in its first eight days. In less than one month following its release, Drishyam became the highest-grossing Malayalam film of all time, beating the record of Twenty:20 (2008). The film ran for more than 150 days in Kerala, with collections of over 430 million.

The film also grossed around 100 million from rest of India. It showed for 100 days in Tamil Nadu. It also had a 100-day theatrical run in multiplexes in Mumbai, Bengaluru, Ahmedabad and Hyderabad. The collection from the overseas markets was more than 40 million, with around 10 million from England alone. Drishyam became the second film to complete 100 days in the UAE after Titanic (1997) and later emerged as the longest running film in the UAE by completing 125 days, beating the 110 days run of Titanic. The film completed 100 days in 60 theaters in Kerala and rest of India.

Drishyam was the first Malayalam film to collect 600 million from its theatrical box office collections, remake rights, satellite and television rights. The film collected more than 580 million in its theatrical run worldwide. Drishyam held the record for box office gross until 2016 when Pulimurugan overtook it.

Accolades 

Jaihind Film Awards
1.Best Film- Drishyam
2.Best Director- Jeethu Joseph 
3.Best Actor- Mohanlal
4.Best Actress- Meena
5.Best Character Actress- Asha Sarath

Remakes 
Drishyam was remade into several languages. The Indian remake rights of the film were sold for 155 million. All the versions were commercially successful. The film was remade in Kannada as Drishya (2014),  in Telugu as Drushyam (2014), in Tamil as Papanasam (2015) by Joseph himself, in Hindi as Drishyam (2015), in Sinhala as Dharmayuddhaya (2017) and in Mandarin Chinese as Sheep Without a Shepherd (2019) with a different ending.

Sequel 

Jeethu Joseph and Mohanlal were filming for Ram prior to the COVID-19 lockdown in India, however the shooting of the film was stalled as some sequences they want to film in foreign locations, such as London and Cairo. As the crew realised that the filming would take time to continue, Jeethu decided to start the works for Sequel. Drishyam 2 was officially announced by Mohanlal on his 60th birthday, 21 May 2020. Mohanlal, Meena, Ansiba, Esther, Asha Sarath, Siddique, Kozhikode Narayanan Nair, Mela Raghu, Aneesh G Menon, Shoba Mohan, and Antony Perumbavoor reprises their roles from Drishyam.

Principal photography began on 21 September 2020, and was shot for 46 days in Kochi and Thodupuzha and it was concluded on 6 November 2020. The film was released directly through the OTT platform Amazon Prime Video on 19 February 2021.

Notes

References

External links 
 
 
 

2010s Malayalam-language films
2013 thriller drama films
2013 films
Fictional portrayals of the Kerala Police
Films directed by Jeethu Joseph
Films involved in plagiarism controversies
Indian crime thriller films
Indian thriller drama films
2013 crime thriller films
Malayalam films remade in other languages
2013 drama films
Aashirvad Cinemas films
Malayalam films in series